8 Aquilae is a star in the equatorial constellation of Aquila, located 271 light years away from the Sun. 8 Aquilae is the Flamsteed designation. It can be viewed with the naked eye in good seeing conditions, appearing as a dim, yellow-white hued star with an apparent visual magnitude of 6.08. The star is moving further from the Earth with a heliocentric radial velocity of +12 km/s.

Abt and Morrell (1995) found a stellar classification of F0 IV for this star, suggesting it is an F-type subgiant. In their 2010 study, Fox Machado et al. assigned a class of F2 III, which matches an evolved giant star.  Despite the spectral classifications, evolutionary models place the star towards the end of its main sequence life, with an age of about a billion years.

8 Aquilae is a Delta Scuti variable with at least three overlapping pulsation frequencies, although the total amplitude of its brightness variations is only about 0.02 magnitudes.  It has a relatively high rotation rate, showing a projected rotational velocity of 105 km/s. It has 1.6 times the mass of the Sun and is radiating 19 times the Sun's luminosity from its photosphere at an effective temperature of about 7,395 K.

References

External links
 HR 7101
 Image 8 Aquilae

F-type subgiants
F-type giants
Delta Scuti variables
Aquila (constellation)
Aquilae, V1729
BD-03 4392
Aquilae, 08
174589
092524
7101